Jana Melichová (born 22 October 1997) is a Czech professional golfer who plays on the Ladies European Tour. She won the 2022 Tipsport Czech Ladies Open.

Early life and amateur career
Melichová was born in Prague and became a member of the Czech National Team, representing her country in six consecutive European Ladies' Team Championships between 2016 and 2021.

In 2014, she won the Czech Amateur Tour Final and in 2018 she won both the Czech National Match Play Championship and the Czech International Amateur Championship.

Melichová enrolled at Old Dominion University in 2018 and joined the Old Dominion Lady Monarchs golf team, where she was Conference USA Freshman of the Year. She graduated in May 2022 with a degree in International Business.

Professional career
In June 2022, Melichová won the Tipsport Czech Ladies Open and turned professional shortly afterwards, having earned Ladies European Tour membership through her win. She become the second Czech winner on the LET, after Klára Spilková in 2017.

Amateur wins
2014 Czech Amateur Tour Final
2016 Czech Amateur Tour 4, Czech International Junior U18 & 21 Championship, Faldo Series Czech Championship
2017 Czech Amateur Tour 3, Raiffeisenbank President Masters
2018 Czech Amateur Tour 2, Czech National Match Play Championship, Czech International Amateur Championship
2020 Maryb S. Kauth Invitational, SLR Academy Invitational

Source:

Professional wins (1)

Ladies European Tour wins (1)

Team appearances
Amateur
European Ladies' Team Championship (representing Czech Republic): 2016, 2017, 2018, 2019, 2020, 2021

References

External links

Czech female golfers
Ladies European Tour golfers
Old Dominion Monarchs women's golfers
Sportspeople from Prague
1997 births
Living people